Stenosigma is a small Neotropical genus of potter wasps.

References

 Giordani Soika, A. 1990. Revisione degli Eumenidi neotropicali appartenenti ai generi Pachymenes Sauss., Santamenes n. gen., Brachymenes G. S., Pseudacaromenes G. S., Stenosigma G. S. e Gamma Zav. (Hymenoptera). Boll. Mus. Civ. Stor. Nat. Venezia 39: 71–172.

Potter wasps
Hymenoptera genera